Milorad Gajović (born July 27, 1974) is a Montenegrin amateur boxer who qualified for the 2008 Summer Olympics as a heavyweight.  He has also had some success as an amateur kickboxer.

Boxing career

6 -time  Jugoslavija Champion, SCG 81 kg, 91 kg
Champion of the 2001 Mediterranean Games . 91 kg . Tunisia
Winner of World Cup 2000. 81 kg . Russia
Bronze medal from the European Championship in 2000 . 81 kg . Tampere
5 place officially at the World Championships 2003. Bangkok in 2007. Chicago 91 kg .
The winner of the tournament "Golden Belt" Bucharest 1999 .
Winner of the Tournament " golden gong ' Skopje
4 -time winner of the tournament, " Belgrade Winner " in 1997 . conqueror
3 -time winner of the tournament " Golden Glove "
The winner of the tournament for the Olympic Games Athens of 2008
Multiple champion C.GORA
Participated in the Olympic Games in Beijing 2008. 91kg .
He won numerous sports awards
He najjbolji boxer FRY , Serbia and Montenegro , Montenegro
Team captain of the FRY , Serbia and Montenegro , Montenegro
3 times best athlete in Niksic 2001. , 2004. , 2007.
In 2000 . best  athlete in  Zemun.
In 2001. among the top 10 athletes of the FRY
Winner of numerous tournaments 
Participated in five European Championships , three World Championships , two Mediterranean Games and Olympics crown career

Kickboxing career

In 2004 Gajović was called to represent Serbia and Montenegro at the W.A.K.O. European championships held in his home country.  He won the gold medal in the Full-Contact kickboxing heavyweight category (91 kg/200.2 lbs), defeating Anatoly Nossyrev in the final by majority decision.  In 2006 he went to European Championships in Lisbon, Portugal making the semi finals and earning a bronze medal for his efforts.  A year later he return to Portugal for the world championships, reaching the final but having to make do with a silver medal.

Professional boxing record

Titles

Amateur Boxing
2001 Mediterranean Games in Tunis, Tunisia  -91 kg
2000 European Amateur Boxing Championships in Tampere, Finland  -81 kg

Amateur Kickboxing
2007 W.A.K.O. World Championships in Coimbra, Portugal  -91 kg (Full-Contact)
2006 W.A.K.O. European Championships in Lisbon, Portugal  -91 kg (Full-Contact)
2004 W.A.K.O. European Championships 2004 in Budva, Serbia and Montenegro  -91 kg (Full-Contact)

External links
 Second qualifier
 World Championships

1974 births
Living people
Boxers at the 2008 Summer Olympics
Heavyweight boxers
Heavyweight kickboxers
Olympic boxers of Montenegro
Montenegrin male kickboxers
Montenegrin male boxers
Mediterranean Games gold medalists for Yugoslavia
Competitors at the 2001 Mediterranean Games
Mediterranean Games medalists in boxing